Dipeptidyl peptidase I (cathepsin C, dipeptidyl aminopeptidase I, dipeptidyl transferase, dipeptide arylamidase I, DAP I) is an enzyme. This enzyme catalyses the following chemical reaction

 Release of an N-terminal dipeptide, Xaa-Yaa!Zaa-, except when Xaa is Arg or Lys, or Yaa or Zaa is Pro

This Cl-dependent, lysosomal cysteine-type peptidase is maximally active at acidic pH.

References

External links 
 

EC 3.4.14